4Ever Hilary is the second compilation album of American singer Hilary Duff. It was released exclusively in Italy on May 12, 2006, by EMI.

Track listing

Personnel

 John Shanks                  – production 
 Charlie Midnight             – production 
 Ron Entwistle                    – production 
 Marc Swersky                     – production 
 Spider                           – production 
 Chico Bennett                – production 
 Desmond Child                – production 
 Andreas Carlsson             – production 
 Joel Soyffer                     – mixing 
 Denny Weston Jr.             – production 
 Greg Wells                   – production 
 Dead Executives                  – production 
 The Matrix – production

Charts

DVD release 

4ever Hilary Duff is a DVD consisted of Hilary Duff's videos, released only in Italy. The DVD includes her Metamorphosis tour (which is featured on The Girl Can Rock DVD) and all her music videos. An exclusive CD, 4ever Hilary Duff, was also released with the DVD.

Track listing

References 

2006 compilation albums
2006 video albums
Hilary Duff compilation albums
Hilary Duff video albums
Hollywood Records compilation albums
Hollywood Records video albums
Music video compilation albums